Ship Street may refer to:

 Ship Street, Hong Kong
 Ship Street, Oxford, England